Paul Barth (9 May 1921 – February 1974) was a Swiss fencer. He won a bronze medal in the team épée event at the 1952 Summer Olympics.

References

1921 births
1974 deaths
Swiss male fencers
Olympic fencers of Switzerland
Fencers at the 1952 Summer Olympics
Olympic bronze medalists for Switzerland
Olympic medalists in fencing
Medalists at the 1952 Summer Olympics